Coelia macrostachya is a species of orchid. It is native to Chiapas, Guatemala, Honduras, El Salvador, Panama, Guerrero, Oaxaca, Veracruz.

References

macrostachya
Orchids of Mexico
Orchids of Central America
Plants described in 1842